The Hawkinsville Public School, which has also been known as Hawkinsville High School during c. 1956-1975 and as Pulaski County Middle School during 1975–1990, was listed on the National Register of Historic Places in 2008.

The property includes a school building built in 1936 with 1949, 1950, 1951 and c. 1968-1969 additions, a separate non-contributing building built in 1954, and a c. 1959 water tower.  The 1936 building was funded by the Public Works Administration, included 13 classrooms and an auditorium, and has a Colonial Revival style with a brick veneer, and was designed by W. Elliott Dunwody, Jr. (1893-1986) of Macon, Georgia.  Two later additions were in International Style.

In 2008, the property was "a multi-purpose facility housing an alternative school, pre-kindergarten, and school system offices."

References

School buildings on the National Register of Historic Places in Georgia (U.S. state)
Colonial Revival architecture in Georgia (U.S. state)
International style architecture in Georgia (U.S. state)
National Register of Historic Places in Pulaski County, Georgia
School buildings completed in 1936